Kouassi Kouamé Patrice (b. December 2, 1962 in Daloa) aka KKP, (baoulé first name), is an Ivorian lawyer and politician. 

In December 2016, he became Deputy for Yamoussoukro Commune in the National Assembly of National Assembly of Ivory Coast. He became a member of the Yamoussoukro Municipal Council in October 2018 and deputy mayor in December 2018.

Early life

He earned a Baccalaureate on "Literature and Philosophy" at the Lycée Classique d’Abidjan in 1984. He attended the University of Benin to study law. He earned his Master of Law option on Judicial Careers, then the Certificate of Aptitude to the Profession of Lawyer (CAPA), at the Université Félix Houphouët-Boigny in 1993.

Career 
He began his career in 1993 in the office of Maître René Bourgoin as a trainee lawyer, then in 1995 as associate lawyer. Two years later, he became a partner at Bourgoin & Kouassi and at Emeritus Law Firm.

He served as treasurer of the Council of the Bar Association, member of the board of directors of CARPA, Vice-President of the Sports and Cultural Association of the Bar, then representative of the Bar of Ivory Coast at the Central Commission of the Independent Electoral Commission (CEI) from 2005 to 2011.

Patrice is Vice-President of the Foundation  la Rentrée du Cœur  and member of the association  Partage.

During the fiftieth anniversary of the Côte d'Ivoire Bar in Yamoussoukro in 2009, Patrice received the distinction of Chevalier in the National Order of the Ivory Coast.

Politics

In December 2016, Patrice made his entry into the Ivorian parliament after a victory in the district of Yamoussoukro. He ran as an independent. He became Secretary of the Bureau of the National Assembly and member of the Defense Security Commission.

He later rejoined his original party - the PDCI-RDA- and became a member of the Political Bureau and the Grand Conseil Régional. He serves as Secretary General of the Abla Pokou section of Yamoussoukro.

References

External links
KKP Official website 

Living people

1962 births
Democratic Party of Côte d'Ivoire – African Democratic Rally politicians
Members of the National Assembly (Ivory Coast)
People from Daloa
Université Félix Houphouët-Boigny alumni